Cornelis O'Kelly (11 March 1907 – 8 September 1968) was a British boxer. He competed in the men's heavyweight event at the 1924 Summer Olympics. He later became a priest.

References

External links
 

1907 births
1968 deaths
British male boxers
Olympic boxers of Great Britain
Boxers at the 1924 Summer Olympics
Sportspeople from Kingston upon Hull
Heavyweight boxers
20th-century British people